Edge of Day is the third album by Jimmy Rankin, released on May 8, 2007 (see 2007 in music).

Track listing
 "Stranded" (Jimmy Rankin) – 3:38
 "Slipping Away" (Rankin) – 3:48
 "Got to Leave Louisiana" (Rankin, Gordie Sampson) – 3:31
 "501 Queen" (Craig Northey, Rankin, Tom Wilson) – 3:37
 "Heaven Is the Last Place" (Rankin, Wilson) – 4:03
 "Hopeless" (Mike Logan, Rankin) – 3:29
 "Still Lovers Now" (Rankin, Wilson) – 4:31
 "Touch of an Angel" (Jon Randall, Rankin) – 3:06
 "Drifting Too Far from Shore" (Rankin) – 3:47
 "Shot in the Dark" (Rankin, Naoise David Sheridan) – 3:55
 "Luckiest Guy" (Rankin) – 3:50
 "When I Rise" (Tom Kimmel, Rankin) – 3:41
 "Beautiful Dream" (Rankin) – 3:58

Personnel 

Sam Bacco – percussion
Greg Calbi – mastering
Gary Craig – percussion, drums
Anthony Crawford – harmony
Brian Harrison – mixing assistant
David Jacques – bass
Fats Kaplin – strings
Colin Linden – acoustic guitar, mandolin, electric guitar, 12 string guitar, producer, engineer, harmony, electric dobro
Margaret Malandruccolo – photography
Brando Marius – mixing assistant
Bryan Owings – drums
Jon Randall – acoustic guitar, mandolin, harmony
Cookie Rankin – harmony
Jimmy Rankin – acoustic guitar, electric guitar, vocals, harmony
Mickey Raphael – harmony
Gordie Sampson – acoustic guitar, mandolin, harmony
Garry Tallent – bass
John Whynot – organ, piano, engineer, mixing
Jonathan Yudkin – strings

2007 albums
Jimmy Rankin albums
EMI Records albums